Raúl Campos Paíno (born 17 December 1987), commonly known as Raúl Campos, is a Spanish professional futsal player who plays as a winger for Palma Futsal.

Honours
ElPozo Murcia
Copa del Rey de Futsal: 2015–16, 2016–17
Supercopa de España de Futsal: 2016
Benfica
Campeonato Nacional: 2018–19
Taça da Liga: 2017–18, 2018–19
Spain
UEFA Futsal Championship: 2014

References

External links
LNFS profile 
UEFA profile

1987 births
Living people
Futsal forwards
Sportspeople from Madrid
Spanish men's futsal players
ElPozo Murcia FS players
S.L. Benfica futsal players
Spanish expatriate sportspeople in Portugal